Sir Ernest Oppenheimer (22 May 1880 – 25 November 1957), KStJ was a diamond and gold mining entrepreneur, financier and philanthropist, who controlled De Beers and founded the Anglo American Corporation of South Africa.

Career
Ernest Oppenheimer was born in Landkreis Aichach-Friedberg, Grand Duchy of Hesse, German Empire, the son of Edward Oppenheimer, a cigar merchant, and his wife, Nanette (née Hirschhorn) Oppenheimer. He began his working life at 17, when he entered Dunkelsbuhler & Company, a diamond brokerage in London. His efforts impressed his employer and in 1902, at the age of 22, he was sent to South Africa to represent the company as a buyer in Kimberley, of which he went on to become the mayor from 1912 to 1915. In this role, he helped raise the manpower for the Kimberley Regiment for service during World War I.

He became great friends with William Lincoln Honnold, an American engineer and chairman of Transvaal Coal Trust, Brakpan Mines, Springs Mines and The New Era Company. In 1917, they launched the Anglo American Corporation with financial assistance from J. P. Morgan. He was knighted in 1921. The initial capital was £1 million. Half of the capital was subscribed in the United States and half in England and South Africa. He would remain as a permanent director and its chairman until 1953. In 1919, two years after its launch, Anglo American purchased diamond mines in South West Africa which would pose a challenge to the De Beers diamond business monopoly.

Oppenheimer took part in the 1924 South African general election and was elected to the House of Assembly as the Member for Kimberley. He held the seat until 1938. In 1927, he managed to wrest control of the late Cecil Rhodes' De Beers empire and built and consolidated the company's global monopoly over the world's diamond industry until his retirement. He gained the chairmanship of De Beers in 1929. Over the course of his chairmanship, Oppenheimer was involved in a number of controversies, including price fixing, antitrust behaviour, and an allegation of not releasing industrial diamonds for the U.S. war effort during World War II.

In 1952, he was appointed as a Knight of the Most Venerable Order of the Hospital of St John of Jerusalem.

Personal life
Ernest Oppenheimer married Mary Lina Pollak in 1906 and had two sons. She died in 1934. 

In 1935, he married Caroline Magdalen Oppenheimer (née Harvey), widow of Sir Michael, 2nd Baronet Oppenheimer of Stoke Poges.

He died in Johannesburg in 1957. Although he was born into a Jewish family, he converted to Anglicanism in adulthood and was buried at St George's Church, Parktown. He was succeeded in the business by his son, Harry Oppenheimer. Oppenheimer's brother, Sir Bernard Oppenheimer, was also heavily involved in the diamond industry, himself dying in 1921.

Legacy

In 1964, the Oppenheimer Diamond was named in his honour by its owner, Harry Winston, who donated the stone (not a gem, as it remains uncut and unpolished) to the Smithsonian Institution as a memorial.

See also
 Economy of South Africa
 Mining industry of South Africa
 Gustav Imroth
 Joel family
 Cecil Rhodes

References

External links 
 
 Sir Ernest Oppenheimer - South African History Online
 History of Sir Ernest beginnings @ De Beers
 Biography Ernest Oppenheimer online version Gregory, Ernest Oppenheimer and the Economic Development of South Africa, Cape Town University Press, New York, 1965

1880 births
1957 deaths
People from Friedberg, Hesse
People from the Grand Duchy of Hesse
Ernest
19th-century German Jews
German emigrants to South Africa
South African Anglicans
Converts to Anglicanism from Judaism
South African mining businesspeople
Diamond dealers
20th-century South African businesspeople
Knights Bachelor
Knights of the Order of Saint John (chartered 1888)
South African knights
De Beers people